Phycita strigata is a species of snout moth. It is found in Spain.

The wingspan is 21–24 mm.

References

Moths described in 1879
Phycitini
Insects of Turkey